The 1999 South Kesteven District Council election took place on 6 May 1999 to elect members of South Kesteven District Council in Lincolnshire, England. The whole council was up for election with boundary changes since the last election in 1995. The council stayed under no overall control.

Election result

By-elections between 1999 and 2003

Harrowby

All Saints

St Mary's

References

South Kesteven District Council elections
1999 English local elections